Antonio Fuoco (born 20 May 1996) is an Italian racing driver who is currently competing in the FIA World Endurance Championship for Ferrari - AF Corse. He also currently serves as a development driver for the Scuderia Ferrari Formula One team and is a junior driver for the Competizione GT. He previously competed in Formula 2 for Charouz Racing System, and is a former member of the Ferrari Driver Academy.

Career

Karting
Born in Cariati, Fuoco debuted in karting at the age of four and raced in various European championships, working his way up from the junior ranks to progress through to the KF2 category by 2012, when he finished third in WSK Euro Series and fourth in the CIK-FIA European KF2 Championship.

Formula Renault
In 2013,  Fuoco graduated to single-seaters, racing in the newly launched Formula Renault 2.0 Alps series for Prema Junior. He won races at Vallelunga, Imola, Monza and Mugello and amassed another three podiums. He also competed in a round of the Eurocup Formula Renault 2.0 championship with the team, at Spa-Francorchamps.

Formula Three

Fuoco stepped up to FIA European Formula Three Championship in 2014, continuing with Prema Powerteam. He finished fifth in the driver standings, with two wins at Silverstone and Spielberg, and 10 podiums out of 33 races.

GP3 Series
On 23 January 2015, it was announced Fuoco would be racing in the GP3 Series with Carlin Motorsport. Despite scoring two podiums, Fuoco experienced an inconsistent season, including crashes at the Red Bull Ring, the Hungaroring, Spa and Monza.

In February 2016, following Carlin's departure from the series, it was announced Fuoco would be racing for Trident, where he collected his maiden victories and finished third in the championship.

FIA Formula 2 Championship

In November 2016, it was announced that Fuoco would graduate to the series, reunite with Prema and partner fellow Ferrari junior and GP3 champion Charles Leclerc for the 2017 season.

FIA Formula E
In October 2018, Fuoco partook in the pre-season test at Valencia with GEOX Dragon and the following month, was named the team's reserve and test driver for the 2018-19 season. In January 2019, Dragon ran Fuoco in the rookie test at Marrakesh where he set the third best time in the overall classification.

Formula One
On 23 June 2015, Fuoco had his first Formula One test with Ferrari during the two-day post-Austrian Grand Prix test in Spielberg at the Red Bull Ring.

On 19 January 2019, when Mick Schumacher was confirmed as a Ferrari Driver Academy driver, it was also confirmed that Fuoco was no longer part of the Academy, but was instead promoted to Ferrari’s F1 simulator team.

He took part in the 2020 Young Driver Test for Ferrari alongside Robert Shwartzman. In December 2021, Fuoco took part in the post-season test at Yas Marina Circuit for Scuderia Ferrari.

Hypercar career
For the 2023 season, Fuoco joined the Ferrari – AF Corse outfit in the Le Mans Hypercar category of the World Endurance Championship, partnering Miguel Molina and Nicklas Nielsen in a Ferrari 499P. The opening round at the 1000 Miles of Sebring began with a positive surprise, as Fuoco took the brand's first pole in the top class of the Championship.

Racing record

Career summary

† As Fuoco was a guest driver, he was ineligible to score points.
‡ Points only counted towards the Michelin Endurance Cup, and not the overall LMP2 Championship.
* Season still in progress.

Complete Formula Renault 2.0 Alps Series results
(key) (Races in bold indicate pole position) (Races in italics indicate fastest lap)

Complete FIA Formula 3 European Championship results
(key) (Races in bold indicate pole position) (Races in italics indicate fastest lap)

† Driver did not finish the race, but was classified as he completed over 90% of the race distance.

Complete GP3 Series results
(key) (Races in bold indicate pole position) (Races in italics indicate fastest lap)

† Driver did not finish the race, but was classified as he completed over 90% of the race distance.

Complete FIA Formula 2 Championship results
(key) (Races in bold indicate pole position) (Races in italics indicate points for the fastest lap of top ten finishers)

Complete GT World Challenge results

GT World Challenge Europe Endurance Cup 
(Races in bold indicate pole position) (Races in italics indicate fastest lap)

*Season still in progress.

Complete IMSA SportsCar Championship results
(key) (Races in bold indicate pole position; races in italics indicate fastest lap)

† Points only counted towards the Michelin Endurance Cup, and not the overall LMP2 Championship.
* Season still in progress.

Complete FIA World Endurance Championship results
(key) (Races in bold indicate pole position) (Races in italics indicate fastest lap)

* Season still in progress.

Complete 24 Hours of Le Mans results

References

External links

 
 Profile on Ferrari Driver Academy

1996 births
Living people
Sportspeople from Cosenza
Italian racing drivers
Formula Renault 2.0 Alps drivers
Formula Renault Eurocup drivers
FIA Formula 3 European Championship drivers
Italian GP3 Series drivers
FIA Formula 2 Championship drivers
24 Hours of Daytona drivers
Karting World Championship drivers
Asian Le Mans Series drivers
FIA World Endurance Championship drivers
24 Hours of Le Mans drivers
Prema Powerteam drivers
Carlin racing drivers
Charouz Racing System drivers
AF Corse drivers
Trident Racing drivers
WeatherTech SportsCar Championship drivers
SMP Racing drivers
Ferrari Competizioni GT drivers
Iron Lynx drivers